= Producer Price Index (India) =

The Indian Wholesale Price Index was first published in 1902 in India. The Producer Price Index hasn't been in use in India yet, but Niti Aayog has created a roadmap to introduce it soon.

The Wholesale Price Index is the index used to measure the changes in the average price level of goods traded in wholesale market. A total of 697 commodity prices make up the index. It is available on a weekly basis for three different categories and a monthly compilation, with the shortest possible measurement lag being two weeks. Because of this, it is widely used in business and industry circles and in government, and is generally taken as an indicator of the inflation rate in the Indian economy. Due to high inflation rates the Indian government reduces some commodities.

In January 2025, a working group was set up to suggest the commodity basket of WPI and PPI for the new base 2022–2023.
